

Historical or architectural interest bridges

Major bridges 

Planned bridges

See also 

 Transport in Mexico
 Rail transport in Mexico
 List of Mexican Federal Highways
 List of Mexican autopistas
 Geography of Mexico
 List of rivers of Mexico

References 
 Notes

 Nicolas Janberg, Structurae.com, International Database for Civil and Structural Engineering

 Others references

Further reading

External links 

 
 
 
 

Mexico

Bridges